The United Kingdom Low Flying System (UKLFS) is the airspace across the United Kingdom in which low flying training is permitted. The system was established in 1979 and extends from ground level to 2000ft AGL. Flying is carried out from 0800 to 2300 during weekdays only. Military aircraft are also allowed to fly in Tactical Training Areas. 

Aircraft are restricted to a cruising speed of 450 knots, and reheat (use of afterburner) is not permitted except for emergencies. Low flying aircraft should not enter any Air Traffic Zones, including Aerodrome Traffic Zones and Military Aerodrome Traffic Zone.

Tactical Training Areas
 LFA7(T), central Wales
 LFA14(T), northern Scotland 
 LFA20(T), Anglo-Scottish border and west Northumberland

See also
 Purple Corridor

References

External links
 UKLFS
 Low flying in the UK
UK Military Low Flying - An Essential Skill

1979 establishments in the United Kingdom
Air traffic control in the United Kingdom
Low flying